Luzifer may refer to:

 the German noun for Lucifer
 Luzifer (restaurant chain), a German restaurant chain
 Luzifer (film), a 2021 Austrian horror film
 a pseudonym for Lu Märten (1879-1970), German writer and activist